The North Korea Peace Museum is in the building constructed to house the signing of the Korean War Armistice Agreement on 27 July 1953. It is located in the former village of Panmunjeom (P'anmunjŏm) in North Hwanghae Province, North Korea.

The building is all that remains of the former village, and since the mid-1950s, references to Panmunjom actually refer to the Joint Security Area itself.

The weapons used to kill U.S. Army Captain Arthur Bonifas and Lieutenant Mark Barrett in the axe murder incident of 1976 are housed within the museum.

There is a symbol of a dove above the door. At the time of the signing of the armistice, a copy of Pablo Picasso's Dove was hanging inside the building. The Americans objected to it as a symbol of communism (Picasso was a communist), and it was covered up.

See also 

 List of museums in North Korea

References

External links 
  Photos of Peace Museum 
 Photo of axe
 Photo of interior of museum

Military and war museums
Peace museums
Peace Museum
Korean War memorials and cemeteries
Korean War museums
1953 establishments in North Korea
Panmunjom
Treaty signing historic sites
20th-century architecture in North Korea